Heikant may refer to:

Netherlands

Province of North Brabant
Heikant, Alphen-Chaam, near Chaam
Heikant, Oordeel or "Oordeel Heikant", near Baarle-Nassau
Heikant, Ulicoten, near Ulicoten in Baarle-Nassau
Heikant, Bladel, near Hoogeloon
Heikant, Sambeek, in the municipality of Boxmeer
Heikant, Overloon, in the municipality of Boxmeer
Heikant, Cranendonck, near Budel
Heikant, Gastel, a former hamlet
Heikant, Rijen, a former hamlet near Rijen in Gilze en Rijen
Heikant, Hilvarenbeek,  near Diessen
Heikant, Laarbeek, near Aarle-Rixtel
Heikant, Loon op Zand
Heikant, Oisterwijk, near Moergestel
Heikant, Oosterhout
Heikant, Reusel-De Mierden, near Hulsel
Heikant, Rucphen, near Sprundel
Heikant, Sint Anthonis, near Oploo
Heikant, Someren
Heikant, Tilburg, a suburb in the north of the city of Tilburg
Heikant, Veldhoven
Heikant, Uden, near Volkel
Heikant, Helvoirt, former hamlet near Helvoirt in Vught
Heikant, Vught, a former hamlet near Vught
Heikant, Waalre

Other provinces 
Heikant, Berg en Dal, a former hamlet in Gelderland
Heikant, Mook en Middelaar, a hamlet in Limburg
Heikant, Zeeland, a village in Zeeland

Belgium 
Heikant, Brasschaat, a small village 3 km south of Brasschaat in the province of Antwerp
Heikant, Heist-op-den-Berg, a small village 3 km west of Heist-op-den-Berg in the province of Antwerp
Heikant, Hoogstraten, a small village 6 km east of Hoogstraten in the province of Antwerp
Heikant, Kalmthout, a small village 2 km east of Kalmthout in the province of Antwerp
Heikant, Limburg, a small village 4 km west of Lanaken in the province of Limburg
Heikant, Lokeren, a small village 2 km south of Lokeren in the province of East Flanders
Heikant, Nijlen, a small village in the municipality of Nijlen in the province of Antwerp
Heikant, Rotselaar, a small village 2 km northeast of Rotselaar in the province of Flemish Brabant
Heikant, Stekene, a small village 3 km northwest of Stekene in the province of East Flanders